Gary Thornton is an English rugby league coach, who has previously coached at Hunslet RLFC and Castleford Tigers U20s academy side from 2009 to 2012.

in September 2022, he was announced as head-coach of Rochdale Hornets.

Playing career
As a player, he spent 4 seasons at Wakefield Trinity before joining Batley in 1990, after initially having a loan spell at 'The Mount' in the 1988–89 season. He went on to make 215 appearances for the club scoring 79 tries.

Coaching career
Gary spent five and a half years as head coach at Batley from October 2003-April 2009(the longest serving Championship coach at the time), and also spent time as U21s coach at Wakefield Trinity.

Gary was Head Coach at York between 2012 and 2014, and Doncaster R.L.F.C. from June 2015 to May 2017.

Has won the coach of the year award in respective Championship divisions:
 2006 – National League 1 (Now the Championship) Coach of the Year – Batley 
 2014 – Championship 1 Coach of the Year – York

References

External links
Hunslet profile
Top accolade for skipper Webster
Bulldog Maloney wins cup accolade
Batley await Challenge Cup fate
Coach Harrison commits to Batley
Thornton accepts Wakefield post
Batley 'defy the odds' – Harrison
Thornton joins Castleford staff

1963 births
Living people
Batley Bulldogs coaches
Batley Bulldogs players
Doncaster R.L.F.C. coaches
English rugby league coaches
Hunslet R.L.F.C. coaches
Rochdale Hornets coaches
Wakefield Trinity players
York City Knights coaches